Aglossa acallalis is a species of snout moth in the genus Aglossa. It was described by Harrison Gray Dyar Jr. in 1908. It is found in the United States in southern Arizona and California.

References

Moths described in 1908
Pyralini
Moths of North America